Lahore bombing may refer to:

2008 Lahore suicide bombings
2009 Lahore bombing
March 2010 Lahore bombings
2010 Ahmadiyya mosques massacre in May
July 2010 Lahore bombings
September 2010 Lahore bombings
2013 Lahore bombing
Lahore church bombings in 2015
2016 Lahore suicide bombing
February 2017 Lahore suicide bombing
April 2017 Lahore suicide bombing
July 2017 Lahore suicide bombing
August 2017 Lahore bombing
2019 Lahore bombing
2021 Lahore bombing
2022 Lahore bombing